Alan W Black is a Scottish computer scientist, known for his research on speech synthesis. He is a professor in the Language Technologies Institute at Carnegie Mellon University in Pittsburgh, Pennsylvania.

Black did his undergraduate studies at Coventry University, graduating in 1984. He earned a master's degree from the University of Edinburgh in 1986 and a Ph.D. from the same university in 1993. After working at the Advanced Telecommunications Research Institute International in Kansai Science City, Japan and at the University of Edinburgh, he took a research faculty position at Carnegie Mellon in 1999. In 2008 he became a regular faculty member with tenure at CMU.

Black wrote the Festival Speech Synthesis System at Edinburgh, and continues to develop it at Carnegie Mellon. He has also worked on machine translation of speech at CMU, and is the co-founder and was chief scientist at Cepstral, a Pittsburgh-based speech translation technology company.

References

External links
Faculty web page at CMU

Living people
Scottish computer scientists
Alumni of the University of Edinburgh
Carnegie Mellon University faculty
Year of birth missing (living people)